Laptop (2012) is a Bengali drama Film written and directed by Kaushik Ganguly. This film tells some stories related to some different people connected by one single laptop. according to the director, the laptop is the antagonist of the film, but not just a common thread between the main characters. It went to IFFI 2011, Goa, Indian Panorama, Dubai Film Festival 2011.

Cast
 Rahul Bose as Indra
 Churni Ganguly as Durba
 Saswata Chatterjee as Gaurav
 Ananya Chatterjee as Subha
 Kaushik Ganguly as Partha
 Rajesh Sharma as Rakesh
 Pijush Ganguly as Tarun
 Arindam Sil as Doctor Sengupta
 Gaurav Chakrabarty as Jiyon
 Ridhima Ghosh as Raya
 Arun Guhathakurta as Shital
 Aparajita Adhya as Saheli
 Anjana Basu as Sumana (guest appearance)
 Jojo as Ritu (guest appearance)
 Neha Kapoor as Amrita

 Pratyay Basu as Soumya

Music
 Mayookh Bhaumik - Music Composer
 Anirban Sengupta and Dipankar Chaki - Sound

Awards

59th National Film Awards
 Best Background Music - Mayookh Bhaumik

References

External links

2012 films
Films directed by Kaushik Ganguly
Bengali-language Indian films
2010s Bengali-language films